Boldogkőváralja is a village in Borsod-Abaúj-Zemplén county, Hungary. As per 2004 census, this municipality had 1,173 inhabitants.

Personalities
 Jozef Vavrek (* 1898† 1970) Roman-Catholic priest

References

External links 
 Street map 
 Pictures, history and Google location of the castle

Populated places in Borsod-Abaúj-Zemplén County